Dybowski's twinspot (Euschistospiza dybowskii) is a common species of estrildid finch found in Africa. It has an estimated global extent of occurrence of 450,000 km2.

It is found in Cameroon, Central African Republic, Chad, The Democratic Republic of the Congo, Côte d'Ivoire, Guinea, Liberia, Nigeria, Senegal, Sierra Leone, South Sudan and Uganda. The status of the species is evaluated as Least Concern.

The name of this bird commemorates the French botanist Jean Dybowski.

Origin
Origin and phylogeny has been obtained by Antonio Arnaiz-Villena et al. Estrildinae may have originated in India and dispersed thereafter (towards Africa and Pacific Ocean habitats).

References

BirdLife Species Factsheet

Dybowski's twinspot
Birds of Central Africa
Birds of West Africa
Dybowski's twinspot